A superior general or general superior is the leader or head of a religious institute in the Catholic Church and some other Christian denominations. The superior general usually holds supreme executive authority in the religious community, while the general chapter has legislative authority.

History
The figure of superior general first emerged in the thirteenth century with the development of the centralized government of the Mendicant Orders. The Friars Minor (Franciscans) organized their community under a Minister general, and the Order of Preachers (Dominicans) appointed a Master of the Order.

Due to restrictions on women religious, especially the obligation of cloister for nuns, congregations of women were not initially able to organize with their own superior general. In 1609, Mary Ward was the superior general of a religious institute that imitated the Jesuit model, but the institute was not accepted by the Roman Curia. It was not until the nineteenth century that religious congregations of women were able to organize with a general superior, and the role is now very common. Mother Teresa, for example, was the superior general of the Missionaries of Charity, known by the honorific title of Mother. Following the Second Vatican Council, women religious formed the International Union of superiors general.

Canon law
In canon law, the generic term Supreme Moderator is used instead of superior general. Many orders and congregations use their own title for the person who holds this position. Some examples are: 
 Abbot general or Abbess general
 Custos-general 
 Master general
 Minister general
 Mother general
 Prior general
 Rector general
 General Director or general Directress

In many cases there is an intermediate level between the superior general and the superior of the individual monasteries or of equivalent communities, often named the provincial superior.

See also
 Commissary general
 Definitor-general

Notes

References

Sources
 
   

Organisation of Catholic religious orders
 
Catholic ecclesiastical titles